Sociedad Estatal de Participaciones Industriales (SEPI) is a Spanish state holding company that is characterized as a Sovereign wealth fund. It is controlled by the Ministry of the Treasury.

SEPI was preceded by the Instituto Nacional de Industria (INI) and the Instituto Nacional de Hidrocarburos (INH). On June 16, 1995, SEPI was created in a provisional restructure which was authorized by Decree number 5/1995. On January 10, 1996, SEPI was ratified by Act of Parliament number 5/1999. This provided for the creation of various public legal entities and the abolition of the INI and the INH.

SEPI Group
SEPI has a direct and majority participation in nineteen companies, which make up the Grupo SEPI (SEPI Group). Its employees number around 80,000 workers. It also has interest in the Corporación Radiotelevisión Española (RTVE). SEPI also has minority direct shareholdings in seven companies, and indirect shareholdings in more than 100 companies.

The SEPI Group has four divisions. These are the energy, defence, food and environment and communications industry investment divisions.

The energy division includes ENSA, a nuclear power operator; the ENUSA group, a nuclear fuel producer; the  group, a coal mining entity; and the SEPIDES group for energy consulting.

The defence division includes DEFEX for defence equipment exports and security consulting; and the Navantia Group for military and civil construction. SEPI holds minority shareholdings in EADS Aircraft NV and HISPASAT satellite communications.

The food and environment division includes Cetarsa tobacco; the Hipódromo de la Zarzuela royal horse racing; Mayasa consulting and project management; the Mercas group for wholesale markets; SAECA food sector investments; the TRAGSA Group for rural and agricultural development; and the Alimentos y Aceites, a producer of fine foods and olive oil. Alimentos y Aceites has shares in Ebro Foods which produces and sells rice and pasta sauces.

The communication industry division included the Agencia EFE, a news entity; the RTVE corporation, the state broadcaster; the Ente Publico RTVE; a public information service promoting citizen participation; and the Correos Group, the national postal service.

The SEPI Group has overview of the social trust fund, Fundacion SEPI which arranges internships, student loans, and grants for technical training and business development activities.

The SEPI group holds indirect shares in more than one hundred commercial enterprises and retains some minority shareholdings in the International Airlines Group (IAG, formerly Iberia/BA) and España, Expansión Exterior (a Spanish exports development company with consulting, finance and technical assistance activities within foreign markets).

SEPI privatisation activity
List of publicly owned assets disposed up to March 2015.

References

External links

Company website
Company website 

Government-owned companies of Spain
Holding companies of Spain
Sovereign wealth funds
Holding companies established in 1995
1995 establishments in Spain